The 2005 Acropolis Rally was the eighth round of the 2005 World Rally Championship season. It took place between June 23–26, 2005. Citroën's Sébastien Loeb won the race, his 16th win in the World Rally Championship.

Results

References

External links

 Results at ewrc-results.com

Acropolis Rally, 2005
Acropolis Rally
Acropolis